James Aaron Butts (born May 9, 1950) is a retired American triple jumper. He won a silver medal at the 1976 Olympics and a bronze at the 1979 Pan American Games. He was inducted into the UCLA Athletics Hall of Fame in 2014.

Butts won the 1976 U.S. Olympic Trials with a wind-aided 17.29 m, just short of the existing world record at the time.  He narrowly missed making the team in 1972 and again in 1980, finishing in fourth place each time (the last time by a mere 1 cm).

Butts won the 1972 NCAA Men's Outdoor Track and Field Championships while competing for the University of California at Los Angeles.  While training for the Olympics, he worked two jobs including as a janitor, to support his mother and sister. He had to train at 5 am as it was the only time that fit his schedule.

References

American male triple jumpers
Olympic silver medalists for the United States in track and field
Athletes (track and field) at the 1976 Summer Olympics
Athletes (track and field) at the 1979 Pan American Games
Living people
1950 births
UCLA Bruins men's track and field athletes
Track and field athletes from Los Angeles
Medalists at the 1976 Summer Olympics
Pan American Games medalists in athletics (track and field)
Pan American Games bronze medalists for the United States
Medalists at the 1979 Pan American Games